This article presents a list of Roman provinces in the Late Roman Empire, as found in the Notitia Dignitatum.

Praetorian prefecture of Gauls 
In Latin, Gallia was also sometimes used as a general term for all Celtic peoples and their territories, such as all Brythons, including Germanic and Iberian provinces that also had a population with a Celtic culture. The plural, Galliarum in Latin, indicates that all of these are meant, not just Caesar's Gaul (several modern countries).

Diocese of Gallia 
Gallia covered about half of the Gallic provinces of the early empire:
 in what is now northern and central France, roughly the part north of the Loire (called after the capital Lugdunum, modern Lyon)
 Belgica II
 Lugdunensis I
 Lugdenensis II
 Lugdunensis III
 Lugdunensis IV Senonia
 in Belgium, Luxembourg, part of present-day Netherlands (below the Rhine), on the left bank (west) of the Rhine
 Germania II
 Belgica II
 in what are now parts of France and Germany on the western bank of the Rhine
 Belgica I
 Belgica II
 Germania I
 Germania II
 in what are now parts of France and Switzerland:
 Alpes Poeninae et Graiae
 Maxima Sequanorum

Diocese of Viennensis 
Viennensis was named after the city of Vienna (now Vienne), and almost entirely in present-day France, roughly south of the Loire. It was originally part of Caesar's newly conquered province of Transalpine Gaul, but a separate diocese from the start. 
 Viennensis
 Alpes Maritimae
 Aquitanica I
 Aquitanica II
 Novempopulana
 Narbonensis I
 Narbonensis II

In the fifth century, Viennensis was replaced by a diocese of Septem Provinciae ('7 Provinces') with similar boundaries.

Diocese of Hispania 
Hispania was the name of the whole Iberian Peninsula. It covered Hispania and the westernmost province of Roman Africa:
 Baetica
 Hispania Balearica (the Mediterranean islands)
 Carthaginiensis
 Tarraconensis
 Gallaecia
 Lusitania
 Mauretania Tingitana or Hispania Nova, in North Africa

Diocese of Britannia 
 Maxima Caesariensis
 Valentia
 Britannia Prima
 Britannia Secunda
 Flavia Caesariensis

Praetorian prefecture of Italy and Africa (western) 
Originally there was a single diocese of Italia, but it was eventually split into a northern section and a southern section. The division of Italy into regions had already been established by Aurelian.

Diocese of Italia suburbicaria 
Suburbicaria indicates proximity to Rome, the Urbs (capital city). It included the islands, which were previously considered outside Italy.
 Campania
 Tuscania et Umbria
 Picenum Suburbicarium
 Apulia et Calabria
 Bruttia et Lucania
 Samnium
 Valeria
 Corsica
 Sicilia
 Sardinia

Diocese of Italia annonaria 
Annonaria refers to a reliance on the area for the provisioning of Rome. It encompassed northern Italy and Raetia.
 Venetia et Histria
 Aemilia
 Liguria
 Flaminia et Picenum Annonarium
 Alpes Cottiae
 Raetia I
 Raetia II

Diocese of Africa 
Africa included the central part of Roman North Africa:
 Africa or Zeugitana
 Byzacena
 Mauretania Caesariensis
 Mauretania Sitifensis
 Numidia
 Tripolitania

Praetorian Prefecture of Illyricum 
The Prefecture of Illyricum was named after the former province of Illyricum. It originally included two dioceses, the Diocese of Pannonia and the Diocese of Moesia. Constantine I later split the Diocese of Moesia into two dioceses: the Diocese of Macedonia and the Diocese of Dacia.

Diocese of Pannonia 
Pannonia was one of the two dioceses in the eastern quarters of the Tetrarchy not belonging to the cultural Greek half of the empire (the other was Dacia); It was transferred to the western empire when Theodosius I fixed the final split of the two empires in 395.
 Dalmatia
 Noricum Mediterraneum
 Noricum Ripense
 Pannonia Prima
 Pannonia Secunda
 Savia
 Valeria Ripensis

Diocese of Dacia 
The Dacians had lived in the Transylvania area, annexed to the Empire by Trajan.  However, during the invasions of the third century Dacia was largely abandoned. Some inhabitants evacuated from the abandoned province settled on the south side of the Danube. They renamed their new homeland Dacia to diminish the impact that abandoning the original Dacia had on the Empire's prestige. The diocese was transferred to the western empire in 384 by Theodosius I, probably in partial compensation to the empress Justina for his recognition of the usurpation of Magnus Maximus in Britannia, Gaul and Hispania.  
 Dacia Mediterranea
 Dacia Ripensis
 Moesia Prima
 Dardania
 Praevalitana

Diocese of Macedonia 
The Diocese of Macedonia was transferred to the western empire in 384 by Theodosius I, probably in partial compensation to the empress Justina for his recognition of the usurpation of Magnus Maximus in Britannia, Gaul and Hispania.
 Macedonia Prima
 Macedonia Salutaris (or Macedonia Secunda)
 Thessalia
 Epirus vetus
 Epirus nova
 Achaea
 Creta

Praetorian Prefecture of Oriens 
As the rich home territory of the eastern emperor, the Oriens ("East") prefecture would persist as the core of the Byzantine Empire long after the fall of Rome. Its praetorian prefect would be the last to survive, but his office was transformed into an essentially internal minister, stripped of its original military function.

Diocese of Thrace 
Thrace was the easternmost corner of the Balkans (the only part outside the Illyricum prefecture) and the European hinterland of Constantinople.  
 Europa
 Thracia
 Haemimontus
 Rhodope
 Moesia II
 Scythia

Diocese of Asiana 
Asia (or Asia Minor) in Antiquity stood for Anatolia. This diocese (the name means 'the Asian ones') centred on the earlier Roman province of Asia, and only covered the rich western part of the peninsula, mainly near the Aegean Sea.
 Asia
 Hellespontus (i.e. near the Sea of Marmara, so closest to Greece)
 Pamphylia
 Caria
 Lydia
 Lycia
 Lycaonia
 Pisidia
 Phrygia I Pacatiana · Phrygia II Salutaris
 the adjoining Aegean islands in the province Insulae

Diocese of Pontus 
Pontus is the Latinized form of Greek Pontos, the name of a Hellenistic kingdom, which in turn is derived from the Euxine Pontus, the Greco-Roman name of the Black Sea.

It mainly contains parts of Asia minor near those coasts (as well as the mountainous centre), but also includes the north of very variable border with Rome's enemy Parthia/Persia.
 Bithynia
 Galatia I · Galatia II Salutaris
 Paphlagonia
 Honorias
 Cappadocia I · Cappadocia II
 Helenopontus
 Pontus Polemoniacus
 Armenia I · II, III · IV added at the time of Justinian

Diocese of Oriens 
The Eastern diocese shared its geographic name with the prefecture it belonged to, even after it lost its richest part, Egypt, becoming a separate diocese; but militarily crucial on the Persian (Sassanid) border and unruly desert tribes.

It comprised mainly the modern Arabic Mashriq (Syria, Lebanon, Iraq, Israel, the Palestinian Territories and Jordan) except for the desert hinterland:

 Arabia
 Palaestina I
 Palaestina II
 Palaestina Salutaris
 Syria I
 Syria II
 Phoenice I · Phoenice II Libanensis
 Euphratensis
 Osroene
 Mesopotamia

Further it contained the southeastern coast of Asia Minor and the close island of Cyprus
 Cilicia I · Cilicia II
 Isauria
 Cyprus

Diocese of Aegyptus 
This diocese, comprising northeastern Africa—mainly Egypt, the rich granary and traditional personal domain of the emperors—was the only diocese that was not under a vicarius, but whose head retained the unique title of Praefectus Augustalis. It was created by a split of the Diocese of Oriens.

All but one, the civilian governors were of the modest rank of Praeses provinciae.
 Aegyptus (in a narrow sense) came to designate Lower Egypt around Alexandria.  Originally it was named Aegyptus Iovia (from Jupiter, for the Augustus Diocletian). Later it was divided into two provinces.
 Augustamnica was the remainder of Lower Egypt, together with the eastern part of the Nile delta (13 'cities') – the only Egyptian province under a Corrector, a lower ranking governor. Originally it was named Aegyptus Herculia (for Diocletian's junior, the Caesar; with ancient Memphis). Later it was divided in two provinces
 Thebais was Upper Egypt. Nubia south of Philae had been abandoned to tribal people. Later it was divided into two provinces, Superior and Inferior.
 Arcadia (also Arcadia Ægypti; not to be confused with Arcadia in Greece)

Apart from modern Egypt, Aegyptus also comprised the former province of Cyrenaica, being the east of modern Libya (an ancient name for the whole African continent as well). Cyrenaica was split into two provinces, each under a praeses:
 Libya Superior
 Libya Inferior

See also
Laterculus Veronensis

References

 Map of the Roman state according to the Compilation 'Notitia Dignitatum'

Lists of historical regions